George K. Aghajanian is an Emeritus Foundations Fund Professor at the Yale School of Medicine, New Haven, Connecticut, in the Department of Psychiatry. He has been a pioneer in the area of neuropharmacology. He has also served as a member of NARSAD Scientific Advisory Board.

Early life and education
George Aghajanian is of Armenian descent and was born on 14 April 1932 in Beirut, Lebanon. He received his B.A. from Cornell University, followed by his Doctor of Medicine at Yale University.

Research and career
Aghajanian did his research on the actions of LSD by which it produces hallucinations in the brain, and he has also uncovered the therapeutic mechanism of atypical antipsychotic drugs. He also found that application of serotonin (5-HT) produces an increase in the frequency and amplitude of spontaneous excitatory postsynaptic potentials in layer V pyramidal cells of the neocortex and transitional cortex by whole-cell recording in rat brain slices. He did research on the structure and mechanism of psychotropic drugs and neurotransmitters.

He was a medical officer in the United States Army in the starting days of his career. He served different positions at the Yale School of Medicine, including assistant professor of psychiatry, professor of psychiatry and pharmacology, Foundations Fund professor of research in psychiatry.

Awards and honors
Aghajanian received the CINP Pioneer Award from the International College of Neuropsychopharmacology. He also received the Lieber Prize for research on schizophrenia. Additional awards include the Daniel H. Efron Research Award and the Julius Axelrod Mentorship Award from the American College of Neuropsychopharmacology, the Scheele Award from the Swedish Academy of Pharmacy, and the Heffter Award from the Heffter Research Institute, and election to the National Academy of Medicine.

Selected publications
 George K Aghajanian: Modeling "psychosis" in vitro by inducing disordered neuronal network activity in cortical brain slices. Psychopharmacology.
 George Aghajanian, Benjamin S Bunney, and Philip S Holzman: Patricia Goldman-Rakic, 1937–2003. Neuropsychopharmacology.
 George K Aghajanian and Gerard J Marek: Serotonin model of schizophrenia: emerging role of glutamate mechanisms. Brain Research Reviews.
 George K Aghajanian and Gerard J Marek: Serotonin–Glutamate Interactions: A New Target for Antipsychotic Drugs. Neuropsychopharmacology.
 George K.Aghajanian and Gerard J Marek: Serotonin, via 5-HT2A receptors, increases EPSCs in layer V pyramidal cells of prefrontal cortex by an asynchronous mode of glutamate release. Brain Research.
 Ronald S Duman, George K Aghajanian, Gerard Sanacora, and John H Krystal: Synaptic plasticity and depression: new insights from stress and rapid-acting antidepressants. Nature Medicine.
 Ronald S Duman and George K Aghajanian: Neurobiology of Rapid Acting Antidepressants: Role of BDNF and GSK-3β. Neuropsychopharmacology.
 Ronald S. Duman and George K. Aghajanian: Synaptic Dysfunction in Depression: Potential Therapeutic Targets. Science.

References

External links
Yale School of Medicine faculty page
"Notes on the Persistence of LSD in Humans" from Erowid

American medical researchers
American neuroscientists
American people of Armenian descent
Lebanese people of Armenian descent
Scientists from Beirut
Lebanese emigrants to the United States
Naturalized citizens of the United States
Living people
Yale School of Medicine alumni
1932 births
Yale School of Medicine faculty
Ethnic Armenian scientists
Members of the National Academy of Medicine